Le Vélo de Ghislain Lambert is a 2001 French-Belgian comedy film directed by Philippe Harel.

Plot

In the early 1970s Ghislain Lambert, a Belgian cyclist who is born on the same day as Eddy Merckx, wants to become a cycling champion after seeing TV footage of Merckx winning his 1972-hour record. He tries to get involved with a big cycling championship, but only gets a job as a water carrier. His obsession becomes bigger when Merckx appears to him in a dream. Determined in his dream of becoming a victorious cyclist Lambert tries to look for different ways to achieve his goal...

Cast
 Benoît Poelvoorde - Ghislain Lambert
 José Garcia - Claude Lambert
 Daniel Ceccaldi - Maurice Focodel
 Sacha Bourdo - Denis
 Emmanuel Quatra - Riccardo Fortuna
 Jean-Baptiste Iera - Fabrice Bouillon
 Christelle Cornil - Babette
 Jacqueline Poelvoorde-Pappaert - Madame Lambert
 Fernand Guiot - M. de Kimpe
 Antoine de Caunes - Narrator
 Frédéric Renson - Manu
 Pierre Martot - Dr. Epedex
 Éric Naggar - Le mage
 Michel de Warzée - Mr. Vandenbroek
 François Berland - TV animator
 Fabian Lion - Swedish cyclist

Sources

External links
 https://www.imdb.com/title/tt0252665/reference
http://www.allocine.fr/film/fichefilm_gen_cfilm=29196.html

Belgian comedy films
French comedy films
2001 films
Cycling films
Films set in the 1970s
Films set in Belgium
Films shot in Belgium
Films set in France
Films shot in France
Films directed by Philippe Harel
Cultural depictions of Eddy Merckx
2001 comedy films
2000s French films